The Mogilev Governorate or the Government of Mogilev was a governorate of the Russian Empire in the territory of present-day Belarus. Its capital was Mogilev, also referred to as Mogilev-on-the-Dnieper, or Mogilev Gubernskiy.

The area of the governorate was inhabited in the 10th century by the Slav tribes of the Krivichi and Radimichi. In the 14th century, the land became part of Lithuania, and later Poland. The governorate was formed in 1772, in the aftermath of the First partition of Poland, from parts of the voivodeships of Witebsk, Mścisław, Połock and Inflanty. Parts of these territories were also used to form the Pskov Governorate. In 1796, Mogilev and Polotsk Governorates were united and formed Belorussian Governorate. In 1802, the Belorussian Governorate was divided into Vitebsk Governorate and Mogilev Governorate. In 1917, Vitebsk, Mogilev and parts of Minsk Governorate and Vilna Governorate were united into the Western District (from 1918 known as Western Komuna). In 1918, it was joined by Smolensk Governorate and in October 1919, Mogilev Governorate was reformed into Gomel Governorate.

Subdivisions
 Bykhovsky Uyezd
 Gomelsky Uyezd
 Goretsky Uyezd
 Klimovichskiy Uyezd
 Mogilyovsky Uyezd
 Mstislavsky Uyezd
 Orshansky Uyezd
 Rogachyovsky Uyezd
 Sennensky Uyezd
 Chaussky Uyezd
 Cherikovsky Uyezd

References

External links
 Maps and lists of settlements of Mogilev Governorate

 
Governorates of the Russian Empire
States and territories established in 1772
States and territories disestablished in 1919
History of Mogilev
Former subdivisions of Belarus
1772 establishments in the Russian Empire
1919 disestablishments in Russia